Marionana paulianalis is a species of snout moth, and the type species in the genus Marionana. It was described by Viette in 1953, and is known from the Comoros and Madagascar.

Subspecies
Marionana paulianalis paulianalis (Madagascar)
Marionana paulianalis cuprealis Viette, 1981 (Comoros)

References

Moths described in 1953
Pyralinae
Moths of Madagascar
Moths of the Comoros